Fleetwood Area School District is a public school district located in north central Berks County in Fleetwood, Pennsylvania.  The district serves students in the community of Fleetwood as well as Richmond Township (Walnuttown, Richmond, Moselm Springs, and Virginville) to the north and Maidencreek Township (Blandon, Maidencreek, Evansville, Molltown and Kirbyville) to the south. The district offers a wide variety of academic courses, music, the arts, sports programs and extra curricular activities. The district meets state requirements across their academic areas (Annual Yearly Progress).

District Overview

The Fleetwood Area School District serves the children of Fleetwood Borough, Maidencreek Township, and Richmond Township. The district covers over thirty-nine square miles in northeastern Berks County. As of the close of school in June 2007, the district’s enrollment was 2,694 students in grades K-12. These students are served in five buildings, including three K–4 elementary schools, a 5–8 middle school, and a high school for grades 9–12. There is one elementary school located in each of the three district municipalities. The tax base for the school district is primarily residential, with a few exceptions, including the factories of East Penn Manufacturing and Giorgio Food Company.

The school district has experienced significant growth in its student population over the past fifteen years. To accommodate additional students, the district built a new high school nine years ago that was followed by renovations and an addition to its middle school. Each of the three elementary schools were renovated with additions between fifteen and twenty years ago. As a result of ongoing growth in the elementary student population, the district opened a new elementary school in fall 2009. The new elementary building, Willow Creek Elementary, replaced Fleetwood Elementary as the third elementary school in the district. In addition to the increasing numbers of students, the district has undergone a gradual shift from primarily a small town and agricultural community to one with an increasing number of students who speak English as a second language or display learning challenges. As a result, the district has employed additional staff to address these needs including English Language Acquisition teachers and instructors to support students with identified special education needs. Overall, 1004 students in grades K-4 are served by 85 instructional staff. There is one principal assigned to each of the three elementary buildings. There are 65 instructional staff to support 813 middle school students and there are 71 instructional staff at the high school to serve 881 students. At both the middle and high school levels, a principal and an assistant are assigned. Central administration includes a superintendent and assistant superintendent who jointly oversee the operation of the school district. The superintendent directly supervises the business operation of the school district in conjunction with the business manager and her assistant. In addition, the superintendent also supervises the director of student services whose responsibilities include special education and pupil services staff and programs. The assistant superintendent is responsible for designing and
supervising curriculum implementation district-wide and, together with the superintendent, supervises the principals. The Fleetwood Area School District is the home of the Fleetwood Tigers.  The school district colors are red and white.

The district is one of eighteen public school districts that comprise the Berks County Intermediate Unit (#14). The intermediate unit hosts regular meetings for leaders of its member districts including superintendents, curriculum coordinators, human resource directors, and principals. These meetings facilitate sharing best practices, addressing problems, and planning professional development initiatives.
The district collaborates with local businesses and the Chamber of Commerce. Presently, the superintendent serves as a director on the Northeast Berks Chamber of Commerce board and on the Berks Business Education Coalition board. Both of these organizations support the training of students to provide the county with a viable workforce. There is ongoing communication between the school district and local employers as to their needs and expectations for new employees.

In addition, the district has many specialized classes assisting students to not only prepare themselves for college, but also to earn college credit. The district offers advance placement courses in English, World History, US History, Calculus, US Government & Macroeconomics, Chemistry, and Biology. In addition, the district has dual enrollment agreements with the Reading Area Community College for Calculus, US History, Biology, English, Accelerated Physics, and Spanish III & IV. The district also has an agreement with Lehigh Carbon Community College for Television Production.

Buildings 
Fleetwood Area High School- located on North Richmond Street, serving grades 9-12 
Fleetwood Middle School- located on North Richmond Street next to the High School, serving grades 5-8 
Andrew Maier Elementary- on Andrew Maier Blvd, in Blandon, Pennsylvania. serving grades K-4
Willow Creek Elementary- located on Criss Cross Road, serving grades K-4
Richmond Elementary School- off of Route 222 serving grades K-4 (closed 2019)

References

External links 
 

School districts in Berks County, Pennsylvania